Amyloid beta A4 precursor protein-binding family B member 1-interacting protein (APBB1IP), also known as APBB1-interacting protein 1 or Rap1-GTP-interacting adapter molecule (RIAM) is a protein that in humans is encoded by the APBB1IP gene.

References

External links

Further reading